On December 26, 2000, a mass shooting took place at Edgewater Technology in Wakefield, Massachusetts, United States. Michael Morgan McDermott, an application support employee, shot and killed seven of his coworkers. It is the deadliest mass shooting in Massachusetts history.

The weapons he used were an AK-47 variant, a 12-gauge shotgun and a .32 caliber pistol.  He fired off a total of 37 rounds, shooting his victims in the back of the head repeatedly. Police later found a .460-calibre Weatherby Mark V rifle in McDermott's locker.

He was found by police sitting calmly and stated that he did not speak German.  At trial, he stated that he was born without a soul and that God had allowed him to earn a soul by traveling back in time to kill Nazis. However, the prosecution asserted that the killings were motivated by his employer's garnishment of his wages for the IRS in order to pay back taxes that he owed.  Evidence also showed that he had researched how to fake mental illness.

McDermott was found guilty of seven counts of first degree murder. He was sentenced to life in prison without the possibility of parole.

Fatalities 
Jennifer Bragg Capobianco, 29, marketing
Janice Hagerty, 46, office manager
Louis A. Javelle, 58, director of consulting
Rose Manfredi, 48, payroll
Paul Marceau, 36, development technician
Cheryl Troy, 50, human resources director
Craig Wood, 29, human resources

Perpetrator
Michael Morgan McDermott was born Michael McDermod Martinez in Plymouth, Massachusetts, on September 4, 1958, and grew up in nearby Marshfield. He was the second of four children to Richard and Rosemary ( Reardon) Martinez, who both worked as teachers. In 1976, he graduated from Marshfield High, where he was rather popular among his peers according to a former classmate.

Shortly after graduating high school, McDermott enlisted in the United States Navy and served for six years as an electrician's mate, most of which was spent on the USS Narwhal. He was eventually honorably discharged with the rank of electrician's mate petty officer second class.

From 1982 to 1988, McDermott worked for the Maine Yankee Nuclear Power Plant. He then moved to Weymouth, Massachusetts, and began work in research and development for Duracell. In 1992, McDermott married Monica Sheehan. They divorced several years later. Around this time, McDermott began to gain significant weight. In 2000, after Duracell announced it would soon move to Bethel, Connecticut, McDermott resigned and later joined Edgewater Technology that same year.

In October 2000, McDermott moved out of his apartment in South Weymouth after failing to pay his rent, leaving the residence in a derelict state and owing the landlord $1,720. He then moved into an apartment in Haverhill. 

It later emerged that, in addition to his other financial troubles, McDermott had owed roughly $5,000 in back taxes to the IRS and that Edgewater Technology had withheld a portion of his wages in order to comply with an order by the IRS.   

As of 2022, McDermott is incarcerated at Old Colony Correctional Center in Bridgewater, Massachusetts.

Media references
McDermott is cited in the 2003 psychology book Why We Hate.

In 2008, his case was studied on the psychology program Most Evil.

Commemorations
A cherry tree was planted outside of Edgewater Technology's offices in Wakefield in memory of the seven victims. Every December, carnation flowers are woven into the branches in their memory.

See also
List of mass shootings in the United States

References

External links
7 Die in Rampage at Company; Co-Worker of Victims Arrested, The New York Times (December 27, 2000)
A Deadly Turn to a Normal Work Day, The New York Times (December 28, 2000)
7 Die in Massachusetts Office Shooting, The Washington Post (December 27, 2000)
In Wake of Killings, Strands of Suspect's Life, The New York Times (December 28, 2000)
Gunman kills 7 at net firm, The Guardian (December 27, 2000)
McDermott found guilty of Edgewater murders: Judge sentences him to seven consecutive life sentences The Daily News Transcript (April 24, 2002)

Massacres in 2000
2000 in Massachusetts
2000 murders in the United States
2000 mass shootings in the United States
Mass shootings in the United States
Wakefield, Massachusetts
History of Middlesex County, Massachusetts
Murder in Massachusetts
Deaths by firearm in Massachusetts
Crimes in Massachusetts
Attacks in the United States in 2000
December 2000 events in the United States
December 2000 crimes
Workplace violence in the United States
Mass shootings in Massachusetts